Vitaliy Anatoliovich Raevskiy (February 25, 1949 – 17 November 2014) was a Ukrainian major general of the reserves, who formerly formed and commanded all of the Ukrainian Airmobile Forces and before then was in the Soviet Airborne Troops.

Early career 
Vitaliy Anatoliovich Raevskiy was born on February 25, 1949, in Khyriv, Lviv oblast Ukraine.

Education 
In 1966 Vitaliy Raevskiy began his education at the Odessa Artillery Institute, where he graduated in 1969.

During the 1978–1981 he attended Frunze Military Academy.

He also attended Voroshilov Military Academy of the USSR Army General Staff from 1989 until 1991.

Assignments 
 1985–1987 – 56th Air Assault Brigade
 Airborne Division of Northern Group of Forces
 Organized Ukrainian Airmobile Forces

Awards and decorations 
Vitaliy Anatoliovich Raevskiy earned the following decorations and awards:
 Order of the Red Banner
 Order of the Red Star
 Order for Service to the Homeland in the Armed Forces of the USSR Third Class
 Order of Bohdan Khmelnytsky – Second Class
 Order of Bohdan Khmelnytsky – Third Class
 The Presentational Fire-Arm decoration – a Fort 12 pistol

References 

1949 births
2014 deaths
Ukrainian generals
Frunze Military Academy alumni
Military Academy of the General Staff of the Armed Forces of the Soviet Union alumni
Recipients of the Order of Bohdan Khmelnytsky, 2nd class
Recipients of the Order of Bohdan Khmelnytsky, 3rd class